Mayogo may refer to:

Mayogo people, an ethnic group in Central Africa
Mayogo language, a Ubangian language of Central Africa